Col. Thomas Brown House is a historic home located near Reedsville, Preston County, West Virginia. It was built in 1837, and is a two-story, sandstone Federal style dwelling.  It measures 40 feet wide and 20 feet deep and has a gable roof.

It was listed on the National Register of Historic Places in 1994.

References

Houses on the National Register of Historic Places in West Virginia
Federal architecture in West Virginia
Houses completed in 1837
Houses in Preston County, West Virginia
National Register of Historic Places in Preston County, West Virginia
Stone houses in West Virginia